Wouter Beke (born 9 August 1974) is a Belgian politician and a member of the CD&V. He was reelected as a member of the Belgian Senate in 2007. In 2014 he became a member of the Belgian Federal House of Representatives and was reelected in 2019. In July 2019 he succeeded Kris Peeters as Federal Minister for Work, Economy and Consumer affairs. He left the Belgian Federal Government in October 2019 to become Minister for Welfare, Public health, Family and Poverty reduction in the Flemish Regional Jambon Government.

Wouter Beke studied Social Law at the Vrije Universiteit Brussel and Political Sciences at the Katholieke Universiteit Leuven. He is a doctor in the Social Sciences.

While working as a researcher at the Leuven University, he entered politics in his municipality Leopoldsburg. He became a senator in 2004. Between 21 March 2008 and 15 May 2008, he was the temporary chairman of the CD&V.

In November 2013, Wouter Beke was reelected as chairman of the CD&V. He was reelected with 98.7% of the votes.

Honours 
  : Knight of the Order of Leopold on 6 June 2010

Notes

|-

1974 births
Christian Democratic and Flemish politicians
Vrije Universiteit Brussel alumni
KU Leuven alumni
Living people
Members of the Belgian Federal Parliament
People from Lommel
21st-century Belgian politicians
Mayors of places in Belgium